The Royal Lancers (Queen Elizabeths' Own) is a cavalry regiment of the British Army. The regiment was formed by an amalgamation of 9th/12th Royal Lancers (Prince of Wales's) and the Queen's Royal Lancers on 2 May 2015. It serves as the Formation Reconnaissance Regiment of the 1st Armoured Infantry Brigade.

History

It appears that the regimental amalgamation of the 9th/12th Royal Lancers (Prince of Wales's) and the Queen's Royal Lancers was envisaged as part of Army 2020.

The amalgamation was announced in July 2012, and the regiment was formed with an amalgamation parade before the colonel-in-chief, The Queen, at Richmond Castle on 2 May 2015.

On 5 April 2017, to mark her 70th anniversary as colonel-in-chief of The Royal Lancers and its predecessors, The Queen granted the regiment the honorific suffix "Queen Elizabeths' Own", to recognise their service to Queen Elizabeth II and Queen Elizabeth The Queen Mother.

Operational role
The regiment is an Armoured Cavalry Regiment, equipped with the CVR(T) family, mainly the FV107 Scimitar. This was intended to be replaced by the Ajax (Scout SV) from 2019; however, after considerable delays, British Army trials of the Ajax were paused in the summer of 2021 due to excessive vibration. The Panther Command and Liaison Vehicle is also currently used.

The regiment consists of three Sabre Squadrons of sixteen vehicles each and one Command and Support Squadron. The Royal Lancers forms part of the Royal Armoured Corps. It is based in Catterick as part of the 12th Armoured Infantry Brigade, one of the three Armoured Infantry Brigades of the 3rd Division.

Colonels of the Regiment 
 2015–2019: Brigadier Andrew Hughes CBE
 2019–Present: Col Richard Charrington

Commanding Officers 
Regimental Commanding Officers included:

 2015–2017: Lieutenant Colonel Marcus J. Mudd
 2017–2019: Lt Col Henry L. Searby
 2019–2021: Lt Col Adam N. B. Foden
 2021–Present: Lt Col Will J. R. Richmond

Order of precedence
The regiment retains order of precedence from the more senior antecedent regiment, the 9th/12th Royal Lancers (Prince of Wales's).

Lineage
The Royal Lancers is now the last regiment in the British Army to retain the title of "lancers". It has directly or indirectly inherited the traditions of the six British lancer regiments that were in existence until a series of amalgamations began in 1922.

Traditions
The Regimental Cap Badge is referred to as the 'Motto' and stands for 'Death or Glory'.

Alliances
 – Lord Strathcona's Horse (Royal Canadians)
 – 12th Frontier Force (Sam Browne's Cavalry)
 –

References

External links
Official webpage

Regiments of the Royal Armoured Corps
Cavalry regiments of the British Army
Military units and formations established in 2015